Gian Paolo Chiti (born 21 January 1939 in Rome) is an Italian composer and pianist.

After beginning his studies in piano, violin and composition at the age of four, he made a series of appearances as a child prodigy before entering the Accademia Nazionale di Santa Cecilia in Rome, Italy's most important music school, at the age of ten. His principal teachers include Carlo Zecchi,  and Arturo Benedetti Michelangeli (private and masterclass studies). Chiti was a prizewinner in the Treviso and Busoni competitions.

Gian Paolo Chiti began a dual career as a concert pianist, often in the company of his wife, the noted mezzo-soprano and president and founder of the Adkins-Chiti Donne in Musica foundation Patricia Adkins Chiti and as a composer. He has written works for almost every conceivable ensemble as well as for electronic media. His catalogue also includes a large number of film and television scores. His compositions have been programmed both in Italy and abroad at such festivals as the Maggio Musicale Fiorentino in Florence, Venice Biennale, Edinburgh Festival, Lutoslawski Festival, Cantiere Internazionale d'Arte of Montepulciano, Nuova Consonanza, Incontri Musicali Romani, Chopin Festival in Poland, Sacred Music Festival in Chartres, France, Teatro Nacional di Caraccas in Venezuela and the Public Season at the Moscow Conservatory.

Chiti has held the post of Head of the Composition department of the Conservatorio of Santa Cecilia in Rome since 1984.  More than a generation of important young Italian musicians have been trained through his teaching. In addition, he is also a member of the Italian National committee for Dance as well as on the faculty of several universities.

Chronological works list
This list includes all serious concert music composed by Gian Paolo Chiti, including works for young musicians. It does not include transcriptions and arrangements, nor does it include film and television scores and popular works.

 Zoological Garden (solo piano - young performers) (1951)
 O Sacrum Convivium (SATB chorus) (1958)
 Sestetto a fiato n° 1 (flute, clarinet, 2 bassoons, trumpet, trombone) (1954)
 Sestetto a fiato n° 2 (flute, 2 bassoons, 2 horns, trumpet in C) (1958)
 Quartetto per Archi (string quartet) (1959)
 Cinque preludi per pianoforte (1961)		
 Suite per pianoforte n° 2 (1961)	
 Tre mottetti per coro misto (SATB chorus) (1961)
 Per orchestra (for orchestra) (1962)		 
 Tre pezzi per pianoforte (1962)
 Concerto per orchestra d’archi (for string orchestra) (1963)
 Concerto per dieci strumenti/for ten instruments) (flute, oboe, clarinet, horn, vibraphone, timpani, harp, violin, viola, violoncello) (1964)
 Due mottetti a cappella (SATB chorus) (1964)	 
 Inscription (solo flute) (1966) 
 Nachtmusik (for strings) (1966)
 Serenade per cinque strumenti (flute, bass clarinet, viola, violoncello, piano) (1966)
 Divertimento n° 2  (flute, violin, viola, violoncello) (1967)
 Especially when the October wind (medium voice, piano)  (1967)
 Holy Sonnet of John Donne (medium voice, piano) (1967)	
 Pilatus (contralto, tenor, organ) (1968)
 Ricercare ’70 (2 oboes, bassoon, 2 horns, strings)(1968)	
 We lying by the Sea Sand (high voice, piano) (1968)		 		
 Y Ara Dirè (two guitars) (1969) 
 Conversation with myself (solo violin) (1969) 
 Matrona Quaedam (chamber opera) (1969)
 Violin concerto (solo violin, orchestra) (1969)
 In Dateless Night (string quartet) (1970/1)	
 Into my own (solo organ) (1971) 
 Lebenslauf (clarinet, violin, viola, violoncello, piano) (1971)	
 Sie erlischt (violin, piano) (1971) 
 Yerma (ballet)  (1971) 
 A Dylan Thomas (ballet) (1972) 
 Andante (flute, bassoon, pianoforte) (1968)	
 Divertimento (flute, violin, harpsichord) (1972) 
 Elegia (flute, piano) (1972)	
 Movements per pianoforte (1972)
 Breakers (four harps) (1973) 
 El Icaro (solo harpsichord) (1973)	 
 Ottetto per 2 soprani, 2 contralti, 2 tenori, 2 bassi (for SATB/SATB) (1973)
 Rencontres (flute, strings) (1973)	
 Spleen (treble and bass recorders, violoncello, piano) (1973)	
 Dal profondo (clarinet, bassoon, piano) (1974)
 Prelude d’automne (flute, viola, harp)  (1975)	
 Replay (2 flutes, 2 oboes, 2 bassoons, 2 horns) (1975)	
 Shahed-B (oboe, harpsichord) (1975)	
 Games Around the Six with Eleven (string orchestra) (1976)			  
 Persefone (solo flute, flute in G and flute in C) (1977) 
 Piccola raccolta per organo (1978)
 Rondeau (solo flute) (1978)
 Anthem (solo violoncello) (1979)		  
 In Mind (solo guitar) (1979)			  
 Flutar (flute, harp) (1979)
 Pastorale (flute, harp) (1979)
 Preludio romantico (piano - young performers) (1979)
 Piccola suite per pianoforte (piano - young performers) (1980)
 Serenata (flute, oboe, bassoon) (1980)
 Around (solo guitar) (1981)	
 Melodia (Bb clarinet, piano) (1981)
 Adieu adieu (wind quintet: flute, oboe, clarinet, and bassoon, horn) (1982)
 Rag prelude per pianoforte (1982) 
 Retour (solo violin, viola and violoncello, string orchestra) (1982)
 Trivium (mezzo-soprano, string orchestra) (1983)			
 Arion (solo guitar) (1983)
 In the Merry Month of May  (brass quintet: 2 trumpets, flugelhorn, horn, trombone, tuba) (1983)
 Kammerstück (clarinet, violoncello, trombone, piano) (1983)
 Konzertstuck (orchestra) (1984)
 Per lontane vie per pianoforte (1985)	
 Ground (piano four hands) (1985) 
 Ipodyon (solo harp) (1985)	
 Triplum (flute, violin, harpsichord) (1985) 
 Wintermusik (flute, clarinet, violon, violoncello, piano) (1985)
 In Sogno (two flutes: doubling piccolo, flute, alto flute, bass flute and piano) (1986) 
 Recordari (trumpet in C, organ) (1986)	
 Tropi per chartres (alto saxophone, string quartet) (1996)	
 Fogli d’album (Albumblatter) (solo guitar) (1987) 
 Abendstucke per pianoforte (1989)
 Action (flute, oboe, clarinet, bassoon, 2 violins, viola, violoncello) (1990)
 European suite (solo guitar) (1990)
 Kinamama (two flutes, piano) (1990) 
 Octopus Line  (flute, oboe, clarinet, 2 bassoons, horn, 2 trumpets, 2 trombones) (1990) 
 Salve regina (mezzo-soprano, flute, oboe, clarinet, bassoon, strings) (1991)
 European Lieder Book (high voice, piano) (1992)
 Intermezzo  (violin, viola, violoncello) (1992)
 Arion suite per pianoforte (1993)
 Cahier des Reves (violin, violoncello, piano) (1993)
 Tre liriche su poesie di J. Basile (soprano, piano) (1993)
 Triple (flute, clarinet, bassoon) (1993)
 Concertino per sax tenore e otto violoncelli (tenor saxophone, cello octet) (1994)	 
 Sur les bois oubliés (solo viola) (1995)
 Rime (medium voice, viola, piano) (1998)
 Laudarium in onore della beata vergine Maria (SATB chorus, brass ensemble) (2000)	
 Plexus (two bass flutes) (2001)
 Envers (orchestra) (2002) 
 Extrême per pianoforte (2002)			 
 Seagulls per pianoforte (2002)
 En ecoutant la nuit (string quartet) (2003)			
 L’età dell’ombra (clarinet, viola, piano) (2003)
 Burlesque (solo tenor saxophone) (2005)
 Capriccio (Bb clarinet) (2005)
 Counterpoint in F (Bb clarinet, tenor saxophone) (2005)
 Prelude (alto saxophone, piano) (2005)
 Two liturgical pieces (organ) (2005)
 Viorgan for viola and organ (2007)
 Blackround (solo bassoon) (2007)
 Florale (clarinet in B and guitar) (2008)
 Nual (clarinet in B and guitar) (2008)
 Sonatensatz (solo piano) (2008)
 Under the Left Hand (solo piano) (2008)
 Saxitude (saxophone quartet) (2008)
 Chaconne retrouvée (alto saxophone) (2009)
 Teorìte (solo double bassoon)  (2009)
 Memoires (3 trumpets in B) (2009)
 Chopin Promenade (string quartet) (2009)
 Quaternalis (horns quartet) (2009)
 October quintet (string quartet and piano) (2010)
 The Dorian way (oboe, celesta, 16 strings) (2010)
 Fluàl (flute and guitar) (2012)
 Languisco e moro (omaggio a Gesualdo da Venosa) (violin, viola and piano) (2012)

External links
 The Composer's Personal Website

References

21st-century classical composers
Italian classical composers
Italian male classical composers
20th-century classical composers
Italian classical pianists
Male classical pianists
Italian male pianists
1939 births
Living people
Accademia Nazionale di Santa Cecilia alumni
Prize-winners of the Ferruccio Busoni International Piano Competition
20th-century Italian composers
21st-century classical pianists
20th-century Italian male musicians
21st-century Italian male musicians